Sai Wan Shan (Chinese: 西灣山) is a hill that lies within Sai Kung East Country Park, south of Tai Long Wan, on the Sai Kung Peninsula in Hong Kong. The hill is reasonably easy for hikers and is a popular site for hiking in Hong Kong. A portion of MacLehose Trail Stage 2 is built along the ridge of this hill.

See also 

 List of mountains, peaks and hills in Hong Kong
 Sai Kung Country Park
 Sharp Peak

References